Matthew Mark Silver is an Israeli historian, professor at the  Max Stern Yezreel Valley College and at the University of Haifa. His main interests are Israel studies and modern Jewish history.

Matthew Silver was born in the United States, graduated from the Cornell University, and emigrated to Israel in the mid 1980s. He earned his Ph.D. in Modern Jewish History from the  Hebrew University of Jerusalem. He is notable as an author of books on this topic and chronicling personalities in Modern Jewish History, notably Leon Uris, Louis Marshall and Gershon Agron.

Books
2022: The History of Galilee, 1538–1949: Mysticism, Modernization, and War
2020: Zionism and the Melting Pot: Preachers, Pioneers, and Modern Jewish Politics (Jews and Judaism: History and Culture), hardcover: 
2021: The History of Galilee, 47 BCE to 1260 CE: From Josephus and Jesus to the Crusades
2019: Navigating US Immigration in Modern Times: A Review and Analysis of Work Visas, hardcover: 
2013:  Louis Marshall and the Rise of Jewish Ethnicity in America: A Biography, 
2010: Our Exodus: Leon Uris and the Americanization of Israel's Founding Story, 
2006: First Contact: Origins of the American-Israeli Connection; Halutzim from America During the Palestine Mandate,

References

Year of birth missing (living people)
Living people

Israeli historians
Cornell University alumni
Hebrew University of Jerusalem alumni
Academic staff of the University of Haifa
American emigrants to Israel